Frieda Schmitt-Lermann (born 24 May 1885) was a German composer and pianist who wrote music for orchestra, television, theatre and voice.

Life 
Schmitt-Lermann was born in Wurzburg. She studied piano privately in Augsburg, then studied composition in Munich with Josef Schmid. Little is known about Schmitt-Lermann’s personal life. 

Schmitt-Lermann’s Kompositionen fuer Violine und Klavier was recorded commercially  on LP KASKA 1 BLN 30. Her music was published by Boehm & Sohn and Otto Halbreiter. Her compositions included:

Chamber 

Kompositionen fuer Violine und Klavier

Orchestra 

Allerseelen Symphonic Poem

Indische Maerchen Symphonic Poem

Serenade

Theatre 

Das Lied von der Glocke (text by Friedrich Schiller) 

music for television

Vocal 

Das Lied von der Glocke (choir and piano; text by Friedrich Schiller) 

Deutsche Schulmesse (two voices and organ)

Drei Lieder

Graduale fuer Mariae Empfangnis (choir and organ)

“Liebeslied”

“Lied vor de Trauung”

Mass in F

Offertorium fuer Christi Himmelfahrt (choir and orchestra)

Songs

“Vor der Trennung: wenn ich mit Menschen und mit Engelzungen”

References 

German women composers
1885 births
Year of death missing